The Convair Model 106 Skycoach was an experimental four-seat light aircraft, designed and built by the Stinson Division of Convair at the end of World War II.

Design and development
The Model 106 was a four-seat cabin aircraft with a pusher engine, fixed spatted tricycle undercarriage and twin tail booms flanking the propeller. The three passengers and pilot sat in a cabin in the fuselage nacelle, which also housed the pusher  Franklin 6A8-225-B8 six-cylinder horizontally-opposed piston engine, driving a cooling fan and pusher propeller.

With a maximum speed of only  the Model 106 was hopelessly outclassed and Convair abandoned development, scrapping the sole prototype, (regn. NX40004, msn. 1), in 1947.

Specifications (Model 106 Skycoach)

See also

References

1940s United States civil utility aircraft
Single-engined pusher aircraft
Aircraft first flown in 1946
Convair aircraft